= Al-'Andalib Magazine =

Arabic children's magazine in Morocco

- Categories: Children's magazine
- Founded: 1975; 51 years ago
- Country: Morocco
- Language: Arabic

al-Andalib Magazine (Arabic: مجلة العندليب) is a children's magazine published by an organ of the National Ministry of Education in Morocco.

== History ==
The first issue of the magazine was published in 1975. Its purpose was to provide cultural enrichment for children. Publication stopped in 2007, then resumed in 2015.
